Icaria or Ikaria, also known as Icarium or Ikarion (Ἰκάριον), was a deme of ancient Attica. It holds pride of place due to its prominence in Greek mythology as the place where Icarius received Dionysus, who taught him the art of making wine. Nearby was Mount Icarius. 

The site of Icaria is located near modern Dionysos, Greece.

References

Bibliography

Populated places in ancient Attica
Former populated places in Greece
Demoi